Meydan-e Mohammadiyeh Metro Station is a station in Tehran Metro Line 1 and Line 7. It is located in Mohammadiyeh Square, junction of Khayam Street and Molavi Street. The station was known as Molavi Metro Station until May 23, 2017.

References

Tehran Metro stations